Fernando Piñero (born 16 February 1993) is an Argentine professional footballer who plays as a defender for Deportes Magallanes.

Career
Rosario Central signed Piñero in 2011. He was moved into Miguel Ángel Russo's first-team squad during the 2014 Argentine Primera División campaign, appearing as an unused substitute in league fixtures with Quilmes and Vélez Sarsfield as well as in the Copa Sudamericana against Boca Juniors on 18 September. His professional debut came on 22 November as he played the full duration of a 1–1 draw with Olimpo. In January 2016, Piñero joined Santamarina of Primera B Nacional. He stayed for 2016 and 2016–17, making sixty-seven appearances and scoring two; notably his career first over Guillermo Brown in June 2016.

Piñero was signed by Agropecuario, a fellow Primera B Nacional team, on 4 August 2017. Eight appearances followed throughout the 2017–18 season. Central Córdoba became Piñero's fourth senior team in June 2018, with the defender making his bow on 1 October against Brown.

Career statistics
.

References

External links

1993 births
Living people
People from Caseros Department
Argentine footballers
Argentine expatriate footballers
Association football defenders
Argentine Primera División players
Primera Nacional players
Rosario Central footballers
Club y Biblioteca Ramón Santamarina footballers
Club Agropecuario Argentino players
Central Córdoba de Santiago del Estero footballers
Atlético de Rafaela footballers
Magallanes footballers
Primera B de Chile players
Expatriate footballers in Chile
Sportspeople from Santa Fe Province